Hua Siong College of Iloilo or HSCI, commonly referred to as Hua Siong, is a private college located Iloilo City, Philippines. Founded by the Filipino Chinese Chamber of Commerce of Iloilo as a preparatory school in 1912, it is the first Chinese school outside of Manila (second in the Philippines).

Hua Siong offers academic courses from basic education all the way up to tertiary levels in the programs of business and information and computing sciences.

The education system of the school is based mainly in Mandarin, Filipino English languages. Hua Siong has two campuses: the main campus in Calle Iznart (City Proper) and Ledesco Village in La Paz, Iloilo City.

History
1912 marked the birth of Hua Siong – the second oldest Filipino Chinese School in the Philippines.

Conceived and established by the Iloilo Chinese Chamber of Commerce, the school was known as Iloilo Chinese Vocational School and was located at Yu Tiak Ha Building at Aldeguer Street. In a short span of time, a piece of land opposite the Yu Tiak Ha Building was acquired and a school built upon it, called Tian Po Hall. A year later, the school was renamed Iloilo Chinese Primary Commercial School with 60 students.

In 1918 the Chamber of Commerce acquired a piece of land along Iznart Street.

In 1927 the school was called Primary Commercial School and later became Iloilo Chinese Commercial High School.

In 1932, more classrooms were added, more instructional materials and equipment were provided, new curricula in the Elementary and High School were offered, and a Kindergarten Course was introduced.

During World War II 
During the Japanese occupation of the Philippine in World War II, among those who stood up against the Japanese in Iloilo were the school teachers and students, who formed anti-Japanese Patriotic Groups. The group stirred the valor of the local Chinese through drama performances. Being the nucleus of the Anti-Japanese Forum, constituted principally by the local Chinese, school teachers frequently organized discussions on current events.

When Japanese aggressors reached Iloilo, some of the anti-Japanese organizers, including members of the Board of Trustees, were detained, torture and executed. Their remains were buried in the Chinese Cemetery.

The war left the school in ruins. The Board of Trustees prepared themselves to continue operations. Through funds from friends, residing in Gigante Island, they were able to finance the new set-up.

Meanwhile, notwithstanding the uncomfortable premises build from nipa huts, classes reopened on November 1949. Years later, a new school building was inaugurated which bore the name “Yu Guang Lou” (Fisherman Hall), after the Gigante fishermen and friends who helped in building the school.

Restoration

In 1950, “Yi Bin Lou” (Iloilo Shore Hall) was established and the following year, “Min Jiang Lou” (Manila River Hall) was inaugurated. The halls were named after contributors regions.

In December 1952, many innocent Chinese teachers were detained and even deported, because they were suspected to be communists. By 1955, after courses in Chinese Senior High School reintroduced, HSCI became a full-pledged high school in 1958 where the first Senior High School and second Batch of English Secondary students graduated simultaneously.

The fire

On 7 February 1966, a large fire struck Iloilo City – the biggest Iloilo had experienced. Almost one-third of the commercial districts of the city were burned to the ground. HSCI was burnt down. To continue the study of the 900 students, the Board of Trustees decided on the resumption of classes a few days after the fire.

The school was transferred to a rented building in Guanco Street. The Board of Trustees, the Iloilo Chinese Chamber of Commerce, and the school formed a School Fund Drive Committee. The Overseas Chinese Daily Publications Corporation quartered in Manila offered to help in the fund drive.

The construction of the first school building started in July 1967, was completed in May 1968, and put into use in June of the same year.

Recent events
In 1975, HSCI was recognized under the name of Iloilo Central Commercial High School or ICCHS. During this time, enrollees increased to 1800.

Because of the rapid increase of population, two more buildings were built. The Cho Tiak Hall and the Po Kim Bi Hall were renovated in 1984.

HSCI was Grand Slam Champion in the basketball field.

The Alumni Association sponsored a “Light for Progress” movement- rallying alumni, parents and friends from all walks of life throughout the country to raise funds for the procurement of an adjacent lot (with an area of 1225 square meters) upon which a beautiful Alumni Park and a modernized Kindergarten Department were constructed. These facilities were turned over to the school during its 75th Foundation Day.

In 1992 the Board of Trustees began construction of a school building adjoining the Antonio Uy Si Kai stage. The new five-storey building houses the school canteen in the ground floor, which sells books and other school materials and snacks. The ten classrooms at each level answered the perennial problem of the lack of classrooms.

The second floor has a T.H.E. Room on the second floor, a Speech Laboratory and Computer Rooms at the third and fourth level. On the fifth floor is the Alumni Hall with a Conference and Audio-Visual rooms.

As of 1996, the student population had increased to 2,000.

Each year HSCI has participated in activities undertaken by the Department of Education, Culture and Sports, by the private sector and organizations in events like sports, cultural and academic competitions. Graduates in past years have passed 100% in the National Secondary Assessment Test (NSAT).

The school announced the opening of college business courses during the 2013 Chinese New Year Festival of Iloilo. The school will be renamed Hua Siong College of Iloilo, Inc. (HSCI).

Campuses

Main campus
The Main campus is located in Iznart Street, Iloilo City. The main and original Hua Siong.

Ledesco campus
The Ledesco campus is located in the Ledesco Villages, being in a subdivision that is distant from the city, most of its students live in the dorm or the surrounding village. Ledesco campus has a parking lot, a swimming pool, two basketball courts, a football field, and a dorm.

Notable alumni
Jose Mari Chan - famous Ilonggo singer.
Alfonso A. Uy - first President of Filipino-Chinese Chamber of Commerce from Visayas and Mindanao.
James Yap - basketball player and celebrity.
Edgar Sia - Chinese-Japanese-Filipino businessman and founder of Mang Inasal, DoubleDragon Properties, CityMall and MerryMart.
Angelia Ong - Miss Earth winner.

References

Schools in Iloilo City
Chinese-language schools in the Philippines
Universities and colleges in Iloilo City
High schools in Iloilo
Elementary schools in the Philippines